Tappeh Bashi-ye Purnak (also Romanized as Tappeh Bāshī-ye Pūrnāk; also known as Tappeh Bāshī and Tappeh Bāshī-ye Pūnāk) is a village in Zangebar Rural District, in the Central District of Poldasht County, West Azerbaijan Province, Iran. At the 2006 census, its population was 341, in 66 families.

References 

Populated places in Poldasht County